Kain-Yelga (Qayınyılğa) is a rural locality (a village) in Tuzlukushevsky Selsoviet, Belebeyevsky District, Bashkortostan, Russia. The population was 91 as of 2010. There are 4 streets.

Geography 
Kain-Yelga is located 17 km north of Belebey (the district's administrative centre) by road. Kush-Yelga is the nearest rural locality.

References 

Rural localities in Belebeyevsky District